Eric England may refer to:

 Eric England (gridiron football) (born 1971), gridiron football defensive end
 Eric England (sniper) (1933–2018), United States sniper during the Vietnam War
 Eric Gordon England (1891–1976), British aviator, racing driver, and engineer
 Eric England (director) (born 1988), American film director, writer, and producer